Éléments is a French bi-monthly magazine launched in September 1973 and associated with the Nouvelle Droite. It is published by the white nationalist thinktank GRECE.

History
Initially serving as the internal bulletin of GRECE, an ethno-nationalist think tank led by Alain de Benoist, the magazine began its public circulation in September 1973 as the general public showcase of the organization. In 1991, then aged 24, became the magazine's president.

Since 2017, the web television TV Libertés has been broadcasting Le Plus d'Élements, a talk show hosted by Olivier François in collaboration with Éléments.

Following the murder of Darya Dugina in August 2022, Éléments posted a tribute to Dugina which compared her to Salman Rushdie and also referred to Volodymyr Zelenskyy as a "clown in a khaki t-shirt".

Audience
In the early 1990s, Éléments had around 5,000 subscribers, mainly from the well-educated elites, along with an audience of university students. A 1993 poll revealed that 35 per cent of the magazine's subscribers were politically close to the Front National.

According to scholar Tamir Bar-On, "Éléments generally appeals to GRECE's younger, more militant audience. Éléments might also be more populist and nationalist than the more aristocratic Nouvelle École", another magazine launched by GRECE in 1968.

Spin offs
There have been several editions of Éléments. The Russian version, Elementy, was launched by Aleksandr Dugin and was published between 1992 and 2000. It also had an Italian version and a German version, Elementi and Elemente, respectively.

References

External links
Official website

Bi-monthly magazines published in France
Cultural magazines
French-language magazines
Holocaust denial in France
Magazines established in 1973
Magazines published in Paris
Modern pagan magazines
Modern paganism in France
New Right (Europe)
Political magazines published in France